Indosuchus is a genus of abelisaurid dinosaur from the Late Cretaceous Period (70 to 66 million years ago – the Maastrichtian), a theropod related to Abelisaurus. Like most theropods, Indosuchus was a bipedal carnivore. It was about 7 metres long, weighed about 1.2 tonnes, and had a crested skull, flattened on the top.

Naming
Indosuchus was named by Friedrich von Huene in 1932 and was described by Huene and Charles Alfred Matley in 1933 from three partial skulls found by Matley in India near Jabalpur in Madhya Pradesh in strata of the  Lameta Formation. The lectotype is GSI K27/685, consisting of the parietals and frontals of a single individual. Two paralectotypes were referred, both including material from the posterior skull, with the fossils referred based on the parietal morphology.

The generic name is derived from Indos, Ancient Greek for the Indus and Soukhos, Ancient Greek for the Egyptian crocodile god. The specific name raptorius means "raptorial" in Latin.

Classification
Because only some skull elements have been found, Indosuchus placement has been somewhat erratic. Although it is now somewhat firmly placed within the Abelisauridae, it was originally assigned by von Huene to the Allosauridae. Alick Walker thought in 1964 it was a member of the Tyrannosauridae. The discovery of other abelisaurids like Carnotaurus has helped clarify its position; in 1986 José Bonaparte concluded it was an abelisaurid. 

Indosuchus is defined based on how the  frontonasal suture is placed anteriorly compared to lacrimal, according to Novas et al., 2004.

See also

 Timeline of ceratosaur research

References

External links
Dann's Dinosaurs

Abelisaurids
Late Cretaceous dinosaurs
Dinosaurs of India and Madagascar
Fossil taxa described in 1933
Taxa named by Friedrich von Huene
Taxa named by Charles Alfred Matley